Skyfire is a Swedish melodic death metal band, from Höör, Sweden.

Biography
Skyfire was formed in the town of Höör, Sweden in 1995 by Andreas Edlund (guitar), Martin Hanner (bass guitar), Jonas Sjögren (guitar) and Tobias Björk (drums). The four were friends since high school and had similar tastes in music. The band recorded two demos: Within Reach and The Final Story. On the second demo, the vocals were performed by Henrik Wenngren. Skyfire got in touch with band members of Thyrfing who helped them find a record label with Dutch label Hammerheart Records. During two weeks in August 2000, Skyfire recorded their debut album Timeless Departure in the Abyss Studio.

In September 2002, the band recorded their second album Mind Revolution, again in the Abyss Studio with new drummer Joakim Jonsson. Mind Revolution was released in 2003 and showed the band's style evolving and branching off into different musical genres. The third album Spectral was recorded at Los Angered and Studio Underground and released on 10 May 2004 by Arise Records.

The vocalist Henrik Wenngren left the band and was replaced by Joakim Karlsson.

On 7 January 2008 Skyfire announced on their official MySpace page that they had signed with a Florida-based label, Pivotal Rockordings, for a three-album deal, and the band entered the recording studio to begin recording their fourth untitled album. Mixing was done by Scar Symmetry's Jonas Kjellgren at Black Lounge Studios.

On 15 May 2009 Skyfire announced a digital only EP entitled Fractal for a July 2009 release. The EP is a collection of B-sides recorded between 2004's Spectral and Esoteric. Fractal was released on 6 July for digital download.

Skyfire's fourth album is titled Esoteric and was released on 14 September 2009 in the United Kingdom via Pivotal Rockordings.  The album was released on 18 September 2009 in the rest of Europe, and in North America on 13 October 2009 due to a scheduling issue. The cover art was created by Pär Olofsson, who also made covers for Brain Drill, Psycroptic, Spawn of Possession, Persuader and others.

On 4 July 2017 the band launched a PledgeMusic campaign to fund their newest EP "Liberation in Death." The campaign was successful, raising the full amount needed in under eight hours.

Band members

Current members
 Martin Hanner − bass, synthesizers (2004−present); guitar, synthesizers, (1995−2004)
 Joakim Jonsson − drums, guitar (2001−present)
 Johan Reinholdz − guitar (2004−present)
 Joakim Karlsson − vocals (2007−present)

Past members
 Andreas Edlund − guitar, synthesizers (1995−2015)
 Tobias Björk − drums (1995−2001)
 Jonas Sjögren − bass (1995−2005)
 Henrik Wenngren − vocals (1998−2007)

Timeline

Discography

Demos and EPs
 Within Reach (1998)
 The Final Story (2000)
 Haunted by Shadows (2003)
 Fractal (2009)
 Liberation in Death (2017)

Studio albums
 Timeless Departure (2001)
 Mind Revolution (2003)
 Spectral (2004)
 Esoteric (2009)

References

External links
 

Swedish symphonic metal musical groups
Swedish melodic death metal musical groups
Musical groups established in 1995